Aage Stentoft (1 May 1914 – 8 July 1990) was a Danish composer, film score composer and theatre director. He composed over 700 melodies during his lifetime.

Biography 
Stentoft was born in Holbæk, where he graduated from the Stenhus Kostskole (now ). Initially, he planned to study law, but due to lack of money, he started to compose music for commercials. In 1934, he began working as an accompanist and composer for the revue troupe Co-Optimisterne. A lot of his tunes quickly achieved widespread popularity, and he earned good money by composing and, later on, by producing revues.

In 1961, he emigrated to Spain. In 1973, he returned to Denmark as leader of the Tivoli Gardens theatre, a job he kept until his retirement in 1981, when he returned to Spain. He died at his home near Málaga in 1990.

Popular tunes 
  (1935)
  (1936)
  (1936)
  (1936)
  (1937)
  (1937)
  (1938)
  (1939)
  (1939)
  (1940)
  (1942)
  (1944)
 Jacobsen (1948)
  (1954)
  (1977)

Sources 
 Kraks Blå Bog online 
 

Male composers
Danish film score composers
Danish theatre directors
1914 births
1990 deaths
20th-century Danish composers
Male film score composers
20th-century Danish male musicians
People from Holbæk Municipality
Danish expatriates in Spain